The superconscious (also super-conscious or super conscious) is a proposed aspect of mind to accompany the conscious and subconscious and/or unconscious. It is able to acquire knowledge through non-physical or psychic mechanisms and pass that knowledge to the conscious mind. It therefore transcends ordinary consciousness. The term is also used to describe transcendental states of consciousness achieved through meditation and related practices, thus accessing the superconscious mind directly.

Knowledge acquired by the superconscious need not be from the present or nearby, it may be from the past or future, from a physically remote present, or of beings undetectable by the physical senses. Superconsciousness is therefore offered in order to provide an explanation for psychic phenomena such as precognition, remote vision and seances.

Mainstream science does not recognise such psychic phenomena as genuine, and therefore regards theories to account for them as pseudoscience.

History
An early exponent of the superconscious was William Walker Atkinson, an American occultist and prolific author of the late 19th and early 20th centuries. The idea was expanded on by British novelist, playwright, World War I-era activist and spiritualist, Edith Lyttelton.

Popov et al have recently suggest that the superconscious is the source of creative and intuitive thought as well as spirituality, and that it arises from holistic brain activity, processing in the order of 10293 times more information than the conscious mind.

See also
 Collective unconscious
 Higher consciousness

References

Consciousness
Parapsychology
Pseudoscience